Oak Lawn Methodist Episcopal Church, South (now known as Oak Lawn United Methodist Church) is a historic United Methodist church at 3014 Oak Lawn Avenue in Dallas, Texas.

The late Gothic Revival church building began construction in 1911 and was completed in 1915. It was added to the National Register of Historic Places in 1988.

See also

National Register of Historic Places listings in Dallas County, Texas
List of Dallas Landmarks

References

Churches in Dallas
United Methodist churches in Texas
Churches on the National Register of Historic Places in Texas
National Register of Historic Places in Dallas
Gothic Revival church buildings in Texas
Churches completed in 1911
Dallas Landmarks